I'm the Hero (Italian: L' eroe sono io) is a 1952 Italian comedy film directed by Carlo Ludovico Bragaglia and starring Renato Rascel, Delia Scala and Marisa Merlini.  It was shot at the Cinecittà Studios in Rome. The film's sets were designed by the art director Alberto Tavazzi.

Synopsis
Righetto falls in love with Silvia, who mistakenly believes him to be a photo novel star. When she discovers the truth she leaves him. However he becomes a hero by rescuing her from a gang of criminals.

Cast
 Renato Rascel as Righetto
 Delia Scala as Silvia
 Andrea Checchi as  Busatti
 Achille Togliani as Bob D'Alba
 Marisa Merlini	 as 	Lucille
 Francesco Golisano as 	Giuseppe	
 Enzo Biliotti	as 	De Santis
 Pasquale Fasciano as Tony Flanaghan
 Arturo Bragaglia	 as 	 Medico condotto  
 Gildo Bocci as Proprietario carrettino gelati
 Peppino De Martino as Er Pirata
 Gianni Baghino as Osvaldo, lo scassinatore

References

Bibliography
 Chiti, Roberto & Poppi, Roberto. Dizionario del cinema italiano: Dal 1945 al 1959. Gremese Editore, 1991.
 Stewart, John. Italian Film: A Who's Who. McFarland, 1994.

External links
 

1952 films
1950s Italian-language films
Italian comedy films
Films directed by Carlo Ludovico Bragaglia
1952 comedy films
Films set in Rome
Films scored by Renzo Rossellini
Italian black-and-white films
1950s Italian films
Lux Film films
Films shot at Cinecittà Studios